Simas Skinderis (born 17 February 1981) is a retired Lithuanian professional footballer. He has played as goalkeeper in clubs in Lithuania, Kazakhstan and Belarus.

He ended his career in 2017 while playing for Nevėžis in the LFF I Lyga. Skinderis has since resided in Belarus since 2009 and is a coach for a private football academy.

In a January 2021 interview with Russian news portal Tribuna, Skinderis expressed support for the regime of Alexander Lukashenko and made controversial statements about the protest movement of 2020-2021, saying that "Belarusians have a slightly kolkhoz-like mentality and you have to treat them more harshly" and that "order needs to be preserved and no gay-parades should be started etc". His remarks were criticized by sports journalist Alexander Ivulin.

References

External links

1981 births
Living people
Lithuanian footballers
Association football goalkeepers
Sportspeople from Panevėžys
FK Ekranas players
FK Dainava Alytus players
FK Inkaras Kaunas players
FK Atlantas players
FK Šilutė players
FC Torpedo Minsk players
FC Naftan Novopolotsk players
FC Akzhayik players
FC Minsk players
FC Belshina Bobruisk players
FC Slavia Mozyr players
FC Gorodeya players
FK Nevėžis players
A Lyga players
Belarusian Premier League players
Lithuanian expatriate footballers
Lithuanian expatriate sportspeople in Belarus
Expatriate footballers in Belarus
Lithuanian expatriate sportspeople in Kazakhstan
Expatriate footballers in Kazakhstan